Badis khwae is a species of freshwater ray-finned fish from the family Badidae. It is native to Thailand. This species grows to a length of 2.9 cm (1.1 in).

References

Badidae
Freshwater fish of Asia
Fish of Thailand
Fish described in 2002